Carbonne is a commune in the Haute-Garonne department in southwestern France.

Geography
The A64 autoroute passes near the village. Carbonne station on the Toulouse–Bayonne railway has rail connections to Toulouse, Pau and Tarbes.

It is situated at the confluence of the river Arize into the Garonne. There is a hydro-electrical dam located at the Garonne.

The commune is bordered by nine other communes: Longages to the north, Capens to the northeast, Marquefave to the east, Lacaugne and Latrape to the southeast, Rieux-Volvestre to the south, Salles-sur-Garonne to the southwest, Lafitte-Vigordane to the west, and finally by Peyssies to the northwest.

Population

Economy
Agriculture based on the culture of cereals (maize, wheat, ...) still has an important place but tends to diminish in favour of residential zones, due to the proximity of the agglomeration of Toulouse.

International relations

Carbonne is twinned with:
 Galliera Veneta (Italy)
 Monmouth (Wales)
 Korschenbroich (Germany) since 1988
 Fuente Obejuna (Spain)

See also
Communes of the Haute-Garonne department
André Abbal

References

External links

official site

Communes of Haute-Garonne
Languedoc